The Trojan Women, also translated as The Women of Troy, and also known by its transliterated Greek title Troades, is a tragedy by the Greek playwright Euripides. Produced in 415 BC during the Peloponnesian War, it is often considered a commentary on the capture of the Aegean island of Melos and the subsequent slaughter and subjugation of its populace by the Athenians earlier that year (see History of Milos). 415 BC was also the year of the scandalous desecration of the hermai and the launch of the Athenians' second expedition to Sicily, events which may also have influenced the author.

The Trojan Women was the third tragedy of a trilogy dealing with the Trojan War. The first tragedy, Alexandros, was about the recognition of the Trojan prince Paris who had been abandoned in infancy by his parents and rediscovered in adulthood. The second tragedy, Palamedes, dealt with Greek mistreatment of their fellow Greek Palamedes. This trilogy was presented at the Dionysia along with the comedic satyr play Sisyphos. The plots of this trilogy were not connected in the way that Aeschylus' Oresteia was connected. Euripides did not favor such connected trilogies.

Euripides won second prize at the City Dionysia for his effort, losing to the obscure tragedian Xenocles.

The four Trojan women of the play are the same that appear in the final book of the Iliad lamenting over the corpse of Hector. Taking place near the same time is Hecuba, another play by Euripides.

Plot

Euripides's play follows the fates of the women of Troy after their city has been sacked, their husbands killed, and their remaining families taken away as slaves. However, it begins first with the gods Athena and Poseidon discussing ways to punish the Greek armies because they condoned that Ajax the Lesser raped Cassandra, the eldest daughter of King Priam and Queen Hecuba, after dragging her from a statue of Athena. What follows shows how much the Trojan women have suffered as their grief is compounded when the Greeks dole out additional deaths and divide their shares of women.

The Greek herald Talthybius arrives to tell the dethroned queen Hecuba what will befall her and her children. Hecuba will be taken away to the Greek general Odysseus, and Cassandra is destined to become the conquering general Agamemnon's concubine.

Cassandra, who can see the future, is morbidly delighted by this news: she sees that when they arrive in Argos, her new master's embittered wife Clytemnestra will kill both her and her new master. She sings a wedding song for herself and Agamemnon that describes their bloody deaths. However, Cassandra is also cursed so that her visions of the future are never believed, and she is carried off.

The widowed princess Andromache arrives and Hecuba learns from her that her youngest daughter, Polyxena, has been killed as a sacrifice at the tomb of the Greek warrior Achilles.

Andromache's lot is to be the concubine of Achilles' son Neoptolemus, and more horrible news for the royal family is yet to come: Talthybius reluctantly informs her that her baby son, Astyanax, has been condemned to die. The Greek leaders are afraid that the boy will grow up to avenge his father Hector, and rather than take this chance, they plan to throw him off from the battlements of Troy to his death.

Helen is supposed to suffer greatly as well: Menelaus arrives to take her back to Greece with him where a death sentence awaits her. Helen begs and tries to seduce her husband into sparing her life. Menelaus remains resolved to kill her, but the audience watching the play knows that he will let her live and take her back. At the end of the play it is revealed that she is still alive; moreover, the audience knows from Telemachus' visit to Sparta in Homer's Odyssey that Menelaus continued to live with Helen as his wife after the Trojan War.

In the end, Talthybius returns, carrying with him the body of little Astyanax on Hector's shield. Andromache's wish had been to bury her child herself, performing the proper rituals according to Trojan ways, but her ship had already departed. Talthybius gives the corpse to Hecuba, who prepares the body of her grandson for burial before they are finally taken off with Odysseus.

Throughout the play, many of the Trojan women lament the loss of the land that reared them. Hecuba in particular lets it be known that Troy had been her home for her entire life, only to see herself as an old grandmother watching the burning of Troy, the death of her husband, her children, and her grandchildren before she will be taken as a slave to Odysseus.

Modern treatments and adaptations

Film
The Mexican film Las Troyanas (1963) directed by Sergio Véjar, adapted by writer Miguel Angel Garibay and Véjar, is faithful to the Greek text and setting.

Cypriot-Greek director Michael Cacoyannis used Euripides' play (in the famous Edith Hamilton translation) as the basis for his 1971 film The Trojan Women. The movie starred American actress Katharine Hepburn as Hecuba, British actors Vanessa Redgrave and Brian Blessed as Andromache and Talthybius, French-Canadian actress Geneviève Bujold as Cassandra, Greek actress Irene Papas as Helen, and Northern Ireland-bornPatrick Magee as Menelaus.

Novel
Sheri Tepper wove The Trojan Women into her 1988 feminist science fiction novel The Gate to Women's Country.

Stage
A 1905 stage version, translated by Gilbert Murray, starred Gertrude Kingston as Helen and Ada Ferrar as Athena at the Royal Court Theatre in London.

The French public intellectual Jean-Paul Sartre wrote a version of The Trojan Women (Les Troyennes) in 1965) that mostly is faithful to the original Greek text, yet includes veiled references to European imperialism in Asia, and emphases of existentialist themes.

Israeli playwright Hanoch Levin (1943–1999) wrote his own version of the play, The Lost Women of Troy, adding more disturbing scenes and scatological details.

In 1974, Ellen Stewart, founder of La MaMa Experimental Theatre Club in New York City, presented The Trojan Women as the last fragment of a trilogy (which included Medea and  Electra).  With staging by Romanian-born theatre director Andrei Serban and music by American composer Elizabeth Swados, this production went on to tour more than 30 countries over the course of 40 years.  Since 2014, The Trojan Women Project has been sharing this production with diverse communities that now include Guatemala, Cambodia and Kosovo.

Charles L. Mee adapted The Trojan Women in 1994 to have a more modern, updated outlook on war. He included original interviews with Holocaust and Hiroshima survivors. His play is called Trojan Women: A Love Story.

David Stuttard’s 2001 adaptation, Trojan Women, written in the aftermath of the September 11 attacks, toured widely within the UK and was staged internationally. In an attempt to reposition The Trojan Women as the third play of a trilogy, Stuttard then reconstructed Euripides' lost Alexandros and Palamedes (in 2005 and 2006 respectively), to form a "Trojan Trilogy", which was performed in readings at the British Museum and Tristan Bates Theatre (2007), and Europe House (2012) in London. He also wrote a version of the satyr play Sisyphus (2008) to round off Euripides' original trilogy.

Femi Osofisan's 2004 play Women of Owu sets the story in 1821, after the conquest of the Owu kingdom by a coalition of other West African states. Although it is set in 19th century Africa, Osofisan has said that the play was also inspired by the 2003 invasion of Iraq by the U.S.-led coalition.

Brad Mays directed a multimedia production for the ARK Theatre Company in Los Angeles in 2003. The play opened with a faux CNN TV news report intended to echo the then-current war in Iraq. A documentary film was made of the production, released in 2004.

The Women of Troy, directed by Katie Mitchell, was performed at the National Theatre in London in 2007/08. The cast included Kate Duchêne as Hecuba, Sinead Matthews as Cassandra and Anastasia Hille as Andromache.

The Trojan Women, directed by Marti Maraden, was performed at the Stratford Shakespeare Festival at the Tom Patterson Theatre in Stratford, Ontario, Canada, from 14 May to 5 October 2008 with Canadian actress Martha Henry as Hecuba.

Christine Evans reworked and modernised the Trojan Women story in her 2009 play Trojan Barbie. Trojan Barbie is a postmodern updating, which blends the modern and ancient worlds, as contemporary London doll repair shop owner Lotte is pulled into a Trojan women's prison camp that is located in both ancient Troy and the modern Middle East.

In 2011, Anne Bogart's SITI Company premiered Trojan Women (After Euripides) at Getty Villa before touring the production.

In 2016, Zoe Lafferty's version of the play, Queens of Syria, in Arabic with English subtitles, was put on by the Young Vic before touring Britain.

In 2021, Anne Carson, the experimental poet, translator, and classicist, published her translation as Trojan Women: A Comic with illustrations by Rosanna Bruno, a portion of which was excerpted earlier that year in the 236th issue of the Paris Review. Carson's vision was realised by Bruno to stage the production of a tragedy in the form of a "comic," or graphic novel with the characters cast as uncanny figures, such as Hekabe as an old, once-regal dog, the goddess Athena as a pair of overalls wearing an owl mask, and the murdered baby Astyanax (last heir to the Trojan throne) as a poplar tree sapling.

In March 2023 a production of Women of Troy directed by Ben Winspear and starring his wife actor-producer Marta Dusseldorp was staged at the 10 Days on the Island festival in Tasmania, Australia. Poetry by Iranian-Kurdish refugee Behrouz Boochani, who was for many years detained by the Australian Government in Manus Island detention centre, was set to music composed by Katie Noonan and performed by a chorus of Tasmanian women and girls, interspersed with the text of the play.

Translations

See also
List of plays with anti-war themes

Notes

References
 Croally, Neil (2007). Euripidean Polemic: The Trojan Women and the Function of Tragedy. Cambridge University Press.

Additional resources
Mortal Women of the Trojan War, information on each of the Trojan women

External links
 

 

Plays by Euripides
Trojan War literature
Anti-war plays
Women and death
Plays set in ancient Greece
Greek plays adapted into films
Women in ancient Greece
Plays based on classical mythology